Maryland elected its members October 2, 1820.

See also 
 1820 and 1821 United States House of Representatives elections
 List of United States representatives from Maryland

Notes

References 

1820
Maryland
United States House of Representatives